Luca Amoruso (born 15 November 1975) is an Italian retired footballer. He played as midfielder.

References

1975 births
Living people
Footballers from Apulia
Italian footballers
Association football midfielders
Serie A players
Serie B players
U.S. Avellino 1912 players
Modena F.C. players
S.S.C. Giugliano players
F.C. Crotone players
Cosenza Calcio 1914 players